The Flag of the Irkutsk Oblast depicts three vertical stripes: blue on the outsides and white in the middle. Within the white strip, a stylized black tiger is seen holding a sable in its mouth. These two are surrounded by branches of cedar. The blue represents the waters of Lake Baikal, while white represents purity, goodness, and honesty. The green of the cedar branches represents hope, joy, and abundance.

Irkutsk
Irkutsk Oblast
Irkutsk Oblast
Irkutsk